Love on Delivery (破壞之王; aka. King of Destruction) is a 1994 Hong Kong comedy film directed by Lee Lik-Chi.

Plot

Ang Ho-Kam (Stephen Chow), a weak, disadvantaged but kind lunch delivery boy, happens to fall in love with Lily (Christy Chung), the girl of his dreams from a local sports center. However, his dream is crushed after a disastrous date with her, when the bully Judo master Black Bear, who also admires Lily, intervenes. That night, in a brutally straightforward fashion, Lily tells Ang that she dislikes weak and pathetic men.

After being further humiliated at the sports center by Black Bear, Ang seeks shelter at a convenience shop owned by Tat (Ng Man Tat), an eccentric handicap. Tat promises to teach Ang kung fu to cure him of his weakness and cowardice, in exchange for money.  However, Tat, a self-professed Sanshou master, is merely a swindler taking advantage of Ang's gullibility, and teaches Ang useless, fantasy kung fu techniques.

But to Tat's surprise and annoyance, Ang is intent on being a full-time student. When Ang loses his job and runs out of money, he tells Tat he will follow him for life. Tat attempts to rid of him by persuading him to use a false technique called "The Invincible Wind and Fire Spin," a move that will almost certainly kill or at least seriously injure anyone – which involves holding onto the enemy and rolling down a huge flight of stairs, using the enemy to soften all the blows of the stairs. Ang is considering implementing the move, but decides against it. However, he becomes reassured of this so-called technique when he witnesses Tat himself falling down the stairs and surviving it, though that was an accident. Emboldened, Ang thanks Tat and leaves.

Determined to change Lily's views about him, Ang comes to Lily's rescue when Black Bear tries to force her to be his girlfriend after Lily rejected him at the parking lot. He wears a Garfield mask a'la superhero. After a scuffle, Ang manages to defeat Black Bear by using the "Spin." The next day, Ang tries to tell Lily that it was he who saved her, but before he can do it, Lily introduces her ex-schoolmate Master Lau, a karate champion from Japan who looks down on the weak.  To win Lily's heart, Lau lies that he is the "Garfield warrior" who saved her. Infuriated from being called garbage by Lau, Ang plans on challenging Lau to a combat match to prove his mettle. Upon seeing Tat at the garbage dump, he drags him along as punishment for lying to him and cheating him of his money.

However, upon arriving at the fitness center with a letter of challenge, Ang and Tat unexpectedly sees Lau in an office with five other people: a Taekwondo master, a boxer, a Kenjutsu practitioner, Black Bear, and the principal managing the fitness center. Since Lau is now in charge of the center, he wants karate, in his opinion the supreme martial art, to be the center's sole fighting discipline. Enraged, the four other elite martial artists attack him, but Lau defeats them with ease.  Frightened, Ang is about to retract the challenge, but Lau manages to get the letter and reads it. Amused, he accepts, but the Principal insists on rescinding it. Nevertheless, Lau reveals a startling revelation: Tat is in fact a world-renowned martial arts champion and has defeated many in tournaments. However, Lau's master broke his leg in a match in Japan.  Tat has been living in obscurity ever since. To redeem himself, Tat promises to prepare Ang for the match against Lau, but only after receiving one month's training.  Lau also personally seeks to kill Ang. In a side bet made by Tat, if Ang can survive all three rounds, Sanshou will regain its public image at the center. An agreement is made.

The upcoming match receives much publicity and reporters follow Ang and Tat, wanting to see how a delivery boy can be transformed to a rival martial artist. To everyone's amusement and puzzlement, Ang and Tat are only seen partying and eating. When asked, Tat replies that this is their training, unnerving some, even Lau.

A month passes, and the match arrives. Lily rushes to the stadium to cancel it, worrying for Ang's life. However, she and her friends are stranded in a malfunctioning elevator. At the boxing ring, Ang is voted the odds-on favourite to win by the judges because of his lack of fear, which ironically increases Lau's own trepidation. As the match commences with round one, Lau rushes in to attack, but stops abruptly when Ang simply turns around and keeps still. This is in fact Tat's strategy: to confuse Lau.  In the second round, Tat instructs Ang to wear down Lau with submissions and sucker punches; all the while, Tat deliberately distracts Lau by juggling things in the air. A commercial break ends round two.

Frustrated, Lau tries to end the match once and for all.  But Ang surprisingly grapples and locks him throughout the whole third round. In a flashback, Tat tells Ang that to prevent himself from losing the bet and his life, he must execute the "Golden Snake Restraint" defensive technique, hence the grapples and locks, which will prevent Lau from knocking him down. Visibly irate, Lau unsuccessfully tries to throw Ang off. Finally, round three ends, and Lau is announced the winner, though Ang wins the bet since he survives the match. Incensed, Lau starts ravaging the place, beating up even the referee and judges. To stop Lau, Ang decides to use the "Invincible Wind and Fire Spin" on him, using an immense lottery wheel as help.  The two spin wildly inside the wheel, and it explodes. Out of the rubble emerges Ang, exhausted but victorious, and Lau collapses in defeat. Lily, realising Ang is the "Garfield warrior," rushes over to kiss him, and Tat reintroduces Sanshou to the public.

Cast and roles
 Stephen Chow – Ang Ho-kam
 Christy Chung – Lily
 Ng Man-tat – Tat
 Philip Chan – Television commercial pitchman
 Joe Cheng – Master Blackbear
 Jacky Cheung – himself (cameo)
 Joey Leung - ringside commentator
 Billy Chow – Taekwando master
 Paul Chun – Chan, the Principal of Elite Center
 Vincent Kok – Niu
 Wong Yut Fei – Ho's boss
 Leo Ku
 Lee Lik-Chi
 Radium Cheung		
 Peter Lai – Customer with a fly in his soup
 Ben Lam – Lau Tuen-shui
 Gabriel Wong – Turtle

Trivia 
Jacky Cheung has a cameo appearance as himself, in which he gives away the best seat tickets to Ho.
The introduction scene of Ho is a parody of the Terminator, in which he walks naked (since he gave away his clothes to a beggar as an act of kindness) in a street before being taken away by police .
Christy Chung couldn't speak a word of Cantonese during the time of filming, so all of her Cantonese dialogue was dubbed.
Lau's glasses and haircut parody Clark Kent (Superman).
The 1996 Malaysian film Siapa Dia was based on this film.

External links
 
 
 lovehkfilm entry
 hkcinemagic entry

1994 action comedy films
1994 films
1990s Cantonese-language films
Hong Kong action comedy films
Films directed by Stephen Chow
Films directed by Lee Lik-chi
1990s Hong Kong films